Awang Faroek Ishak (born 31 July 1948 in Tenggarong, East Kalimantan) is an Indonesian politician who was the Governor of East Kalimantan, Indonesia. Awang Faroek assumed office in December 2008. Originally his tenure ended in December 2018, but he resigned on 4 September 2018 because he wants to run in 2019 Legislative Election competing for a seat in the People's Representative Council from East Kalimantan and then got elected.

Early life
Ishak was known as a lecturer in Mulawarman University in Samarinda, he gained the position of Dean of Education Faculty and 3rd University Director Assistant.

Political life

Ishak was a member of the People's Representative Council for two terms, from 1987 to 1992 and from 1992 to 1997. After the reform era, Ishak was chosen to be an acting regent for the newly created regency of East Kutai that was previously part of Kutai Kartanegara Regency. Ishak was regent from 1999 until 2003 when he resigned to run for the position of governor of East Kalimantan. However Ishak was defeated in the election by Suwarna Abdul Fatah.

When the first direct elections for regent were held in East Kutai in 2006 Ishak became a candidate, running against his former vice regent Mahyudin.

Ishak re-took the Regent position from Mahyudin after winning the East Kalimantan gubernatorial election in 2008 in two rounds. In the first round, Ishak and his running mate Farid Wadjdy won first place, defeating Achmad Amins and Jusuf SK. But because Ishak did not poll strongly enough to win outright (less than the 30% of the ballot needed to be declared the winner), the KPU (Election Committee) declared that a second round would be necessary with Ishak and Achmad Amins as the two runoff candidates. The second round of the gubernatorial elections were held in October 2008. Ishak won more than 50% of popular vote and became the 12th Governor of East Kalimantan.

In 2018, he declared his intention to run for the People's Representative Council, resigning from governorship on 18 September.

References

1948 births
Living people
People from Kutai Kartanegara Regency
Governors of East Kalimantan
Indonesian Muslims
Members of the People's Representative Council, 1987
Members of the People's Representative Council, 1992
Mayors and regents of places in East Kalimantan
Regents of places in Indonesia